Kolvanaq (also Romanized as Kolvānaq) is a village in Qebleh Daghi Rural District, Howmeh District, Azarshahr County, East Azerbaijan Province, Iran. At the 2006 census, its population was 368, in 88 families.

References 

Populated places in Azarshahr County